The 2006 FIBA Europe Under-16 Championship was the 20th edition of the FIBA Europe Under-16 Championship. The cities of Linares, Andújar and Martos, in Spain, hosted the tournament. Spain won the trophy for the first time. Germany and Iceland were relegated to Division B.

Teams

Preliminary round

Group A

Group B

Group C

Group D

Classification round

Group G

Group H

Quarterfinals round

Group E

Group F

Knockout stage

13th–16th playoffs

Germany and Iceland were relegated to Division B.

9th–12th playoffs

5th–8th playoffs

Championship

Final standings

References
FIBA Archive
FIBA Europe Archive

FIBA U16 European Championship
2006–07 in European basketball
2006–07 in Spanish basketball
International youth basketball competitions hosted by Spain